Hydroptila acuta is a species of Trichoptera in the large genus Hydroptila.

References

Hydroptilidae